Jontte Valosaari (born 5 April 1980) is a Finnish pop singer. He is best known for his first solo single "Jos mä oisin sun mies".

Career beginnings

Valosaari was first recognized by rapper Elastinen when he was doing construction work for him. Elastinen invited him over for studio sessions, resulting in Valosaari's first solo single "Jos mä oisin sun mies", on which Elastinen also appeared as a featured guest. The song was released on 9 November 2012, and it peaked at number two on the Official Finnish Singles Chart. Valosaari has also been heard as a featured guest on songs by fellow rappers Brädi and Cheek.

2013–present: Haastaja

Valosaari signed a recording deal with EMI Finland in 2012 and started working with producer Henri "MGI" Lanz. After their recording sessions in Los Angeles, Valosaari and MGI came up with 11 tracks for Valosaari's first album Haastaja, released on 26 April 2013. The second single from the album, the title track, was released on 15 February 2013. In May 2013, the album peaked at number 29 on the Finnish Album Chart.

Personal life

Jontte Valosaari married a bikini fitness athlete Mari Kasvi in 2013. They have one daughter. Aside from his musical career, Valosaari is also working as a firefighter.

Selected discography

Albums

Singles

As a featured artist

References

Living people
Finnish male musicians
1980 births